[[File:Гравюра Цюндта.jpg|thumbnail|250px|View of the city of Grodno, in the Grand Duchy of Lithuania, 1568]]

Matthias Zündt (sometimes Zynndt; 1498–1586) was a German engraver, born at Nuremberg. He worked with both the graver and point, and produced portraits, Scripture subjects, allegories, and crests. Brulliot mentions an etching with a mark supposed to be his; it represents a Vase with figures of Tritons, standing on sea-horses' feet, and surmounted by a figure of Neptune. Bartsch describes these three prints by him:Portrait of Giovanni de Raleta, Grand Master of the Knights of Malta, 1566.Portrait of Louis III de Bourbon-Conde, 1568.View of the city of Grodno, in Lithuania'', 1568.

References

External links
 16th Century map of Hungary by Zündt at the World Digital Library

1498 births
1586 deaths
German engravers
Artists from Nuremberg